Muniria megalophylla is a flowering plant in the mint family Lamiaceae and is endemic to Arnhem Land in the Northern Territory. It is a shrub with its branches and leaves densely covered with a layer of short, greyish, branched hairs and small groups of reddish-pink flowers near the ends of the branches.

Description
The branches, leaves and some of the flower parts are densely covered with woolly, greyish, branched hairs. The upper surface of the leaves is wrinkled and the lower surface has a distinct network of veins.

The flowers are surrounded by leaf-like bracts and bracteoles. The tube is densely woolly on the outside but mostly glabrous inside except for a narrow ring of hairs around the ovary and a few hairs on the largest petal lobe. The four stamens reach past the end of the tube, the lower pair longer than the upper ones.

Taxonomy and naming
This species was first formally described in 1979 by Ahmad Abid Munir from a specimen collected near Yaimanyi Creek in Arnhem Land. It was given the name Pityrodia megalophylla and the description was published in Journal of the Adelaide Botanic Gardens. In 2011, Barry Conn, Murray Henwood and Nicola Streiber described a new genus, Muniria and transferred this species to it. The specific epithet (megalophylla) is derived from the Ancient Greek words megalo meaning "large" or "great" and phyllon meaning "leaf".

Distribution
This only known location is the type location near Yaimanyi Creek in Arnhem Land.

Conservation
Muniria megalophylla is classified as "data deficient" under the Territory Parks and Wildlife Conservation Act.

References

External links
Muniria megalophylla occurrence data from Australasian Virtual Herbarium
 
 

megalophylla
Plants described in 1979
Flora of the Northern Territory